The 2022 Big Sky Conference women's basketball tournament was the postseason tournament for the Big Sky Conference, held March 7–11 at Idaho Central Arena in Boise, Idaho. It was the 39th edition of the tournament, which debuted in 1983.

Seeds 
The eleven teams were seeded by conference record, with a tiebreaker system used to seed teams with identical conference records. The top five teams received a first-round bye.

Schedule

Bracket

References 

2021–22 Big Sky Conference women's basketball season
Big Sky Conference women's basketball tournament
Big Sky Conference women's basketball tournament
Big Sky Conference women's basketball tournament
Basketball competitions in Boise, Idaho
College basketball tournaments in Idaho
Women's sports in Idaho